Birds on the Wing is a 1971 British comedy television series which originally aired in a single series of six episodes on BBC 2. A businessman becomes enamoured of an attractive young woman, who he finds out is trying to con him with her friend. The three form an unlikely alliance.

Main cast
 Richard Briers as Charles Jackson
 Julia Lockwood as Samantha
 Anne Rogers as  Elizabeth

References

Bibliography
 Wagg, Stephen. Because I Tell a Joke or Two: Comedy, Politics and Social Difference. Routledge, 2004.

External links
 

1971 British television series debuts
1971 British television series endings
1970s British comedy television series
BBC television sitcoms
English-language television shows